The  (formerly the  until 2016) is a railway museum in Shimogyō-ku, Kyoto, Japan. The original Umekoji Steam Locomotive Museum opened in 1972, but was expanded and modernized in 2016, becoming the Kyoto Railway Museum.

The museum is owned by West Japan Railway Company (JR West) and is operated by Transportation Culture Promotion Foundation.

Exhibition zones
The museum is divided into the following exhibition areas, including the 20-track roundhouse built in 1914.

 Promenade
 Main Hall
 Twilight Plaza
 Roundhouse
 Former Nijō Station

Main Hall
This is a three-storey building completed in April 2016.

Roundhouse
The 1914 roundhouse was built surrounding a turntable. It is an Important Cultural Property designated by the government of Japan as the oldest reinforced-concrete car shed extant in Japan.

Former Nijo Station
This two-storey structure was formerly part of Nijō Station in Kyoto until March 1996, and was subsequently moved to the Umekoji Steam Locomotive Museum where if formed the entrance building, housing the museum shop.

Exhibits
 a total of 53 rolling stock items are on display at the museum.

Steam locomotives

Diesel locomotives

Electric locomotives

Shinkansen

EMUs

DMUs

Coaches

Freight wagons

History
As early as 1967 plans were being made to make the round-house at Umekoji depot, Kyoto into a live museum where good-order examples of Japanese steam locomotives could be displayed and also steamed and run. The museum was opened by Japanese National Railways (JNR) on October 10, 1972 commemorating the centennial of the railway in Japan. When JNR was divided into regional companies in 1987, the museum was inherited by JR West.

Expansion plans
On 19 December 2012, JR West officially announced its plans to modernize and expand the Umekoji museum. It was announced on 18 December 2013 that the enlarged museum would be renamed the Kyoto Railway Museum. The construction cost was 7.0 billion yen.

Once the expansion was complete, the new museum exhibit space covered 31,000 square meters, becoming the largest railway museum in Japan both in terms of floor space and the number of trains exhibited, and surpassing JR East's Railway Museum in Saitama and JR Central's SCMaglev and Railway Park in Nagoya.

The expansion became necessary due to the aging facilities of the Modern Transportation Museum in Osaka. The Modern Transportation Museum closed on 6 April 2014, and the exhibits housed there were subsequently moved to the new railway museum in Kyoto.

Access
The museum is approximately 3 minutes on foot from Umekōji-Kyōtonishi Station.

See also 

 JR East Railway Museum, Saitama, Saitama Prefecture
 JR Central SCMaglev and Railway Park, Nagoya, Aichi Prefecture

References

Further reading

External links

 

Museums established in 1972
Museums in Kyoto
Railway museums in Japan
West Japan Railway Company
1972 establishments in Japan
Important Cultural Properties of Japan